Kotor (Montenegrin Cyrillic: Котор), historically known as Cattaro, is a coastal town in Montenegro. It is located in a secluded part of the Bay of Kotor. The city has a population of 13,510 and is the administrative center of Kotor Municipality.

The old Mediterranean port of Kotor is surrounded by fortifications built during the Venetian period. It is located on the Bay of Kotor (Boka Kotorska), one of the most indented parts of the Adriatic Sea. Some have called it the southernmost fjord in Europe, but it is a ria, a submerged river canyon. Together with the nearly overhanging limestone cliffs of Orjen and Lovćen, Kotor and its surrounding area form an impressive landscape.

Since the early 2000s Kotor has seen an increase in tourists, many of them coming by cruise ship. Visitors are attracted by the natural environment of the Gulf of Kotor and by the old town of Kotor. Kotor is part of the World Heritage Site dubbed the Natural and Culturo-Historical Region of Kotor.

The fortified city of Kotor was also included in UNESCO's World Heritage Site list as part of Venetian Works of Defence between 16th and 17th centuries: Stato da Terra – western Stato da Mar in 2017.

History

Early history 

Once populated by the Illyrians, the exact time of foundation of the first settlement is not known. According to some sources, the oldest settled area dates two millennia back.

The town, first mentioned in 168 BC, was settled during Ancient Roman times, when it was known as Acruvium, Ascrivium, or Ascruvium and was part of the Roman province of Dalmatia.

Middle Ages 

The town has been fortified since the early Middle Ages, when Emperor Justinian built a fortress above Ascrivium in 535, after expelling the Ostrogoths. Ascrivium was plundered by the Saracens in 840. It was further fortified towards the peak of Saint Ivan by Constantine VII Porphyrogennetos in the 10th century.
It was one of the more influential Dalmatian city-states, initially with a Romance-speaking population, as throughout the early Middle Ages, and until the 11th century the Dalmatian language was still spoken in Kotor. The city was part of Byzantine Dalmatia in that period, and the modern name of Kotor probably originated in the Byzantine name for the town: Dekatera or Dekaderon.

In 1002, the city suffered damage under the occupation of the First Bulgarian Empire, and in the following year it was ceded to Duklja by the Bulgarian Tsar Samuil. Duklja, or Dioclea, was a vassal duchy of Byzantium at the time. The local population resisted the pact and, taking advantage of its alliance with Dubrovnik, maintained its high autonomy. Duklja, the biggest Serb duchy at the time, gradually became more powerful under Vojislavljević dynasty and eventually independent from Byzantium in 1042. The city remained autonomous up until Duklja was once again subdued by Byzantium in 1143.

The city was conquered in 1185 by Stefan Nemanja, the ruler of the Grand Principality of Serbia and founder of the Nemanjić dynasty. At that time Kotor was already an episcopal see subordinated to the archbishopric of Bari, and in 13th century, Dominican and Franciscan monasteries were established to check the spread of Bogomilism. Under the rule of the Nemanjić Kotor became a partially autonomous city, enjoying many privileges and maintaining its republican institutions. This is backed by a statute from 1301, which demonstrates that Kotor had the status of a city under Serbian rule. In the 14th century the commerce of Cattaro, as named in Latin scripts (in Serbian Котор, град краљев/Kotor, city of the King), rivaled that of Republic of Ragusa, and caused the Republic of Venice to be envious. Kotor remained the most important trading port of subsequent Serb states – Kingdom of Serbia and Serbian Empire, up to its downfall in 1371.

After the fracturing of the Serbian Empire, the city was taken by the Kingdom of Hungary, only to change hands repeatedly between them and the Republic of Venice in the period between 1371 and 1384. After that, Kotor was held by the Kingdom of Bosnia  under Tvrtko I Kotromanić between 1384 and 1391. The king of Bosnia, who claimed the Serbian throne, minted his coins in Kotor.

After the death of Tvrtko in 1391, Kotor became fully independent, until the administration, wary of the looming Ottoman danger, asked the Republic of Venice for protection. The city acknowledged the suzerainty of the Republic of Venice in 1420.

Venetian rule

The city was part of the Venetian Albania  province of the Venetian Republic from 1420 to 1797.

Four centuries of Venetian domination have given the city the typical Venetian architecture, that contributes to make Kotor a UNESCO world heritage site.

In the 14th and 15th centuries, there was an influx of settlers from the oblasts of Trebinje (the region around forts Klobuk Ledenica and Rudina) and the Hum lands (Gacko and Dabar) to Kotor. The Italian name of the city is Cattaro. Under Venetian rule, Kotor was besieged by the Ottoman Empire in 1538 and 1657, endured the plague in 1572, and was nearly destroyed by earthquakes in 1563 and 1667.

Habsburg and Napoleonic rule

After the Treaty of Campo Formio in 1797, it passed to the Habsburg monarchy. However, in 1805, it was assigned to the French Empire's client state, the Napoleonic Kingdom of Italy, by the Treaty of Pressburg, although in fact held by a Russian squadron under Dmitry Senyavin.  After the Russians retreated, Kotor was united in 1806 with this Kingdom of Italy and then in 1810 with the French Empire's Illyrian Provinces. Kotor was captured by the British in an attack on the Bay led by Commodore John Harper in the brig sloop  (18 guns). To seal off Kotor, residents along the shore literally pulled the ship in windless conditions with ropes. The Saracen's crew later hauled naval 18-pounder guns above Fort St. John, the fortress near Kotor, and were reinforced by Captain William Hoste with his ship  (38 guns). The French garrison had no alternative but to surrender, which it did on 5 January 1814.

It was restored to the Habsburg monarchy by the Congress of Vienna. Until 1918, the town, then known as Cattaro, was head of the district of the same name, one of the 13 Bezirkshauptmannschaften in the Kingdom of Dalmatia.

World War I
During World War I, Cattaro was one of three main bases of the Austro-Hungarian Navy, the home port of the Austrian Fifth Fleet, consisting of pre-dreadnought battleships and light cruisers, and a base for Austrian and German submarines.

The area was the site of some of the fiercest battles between local Montenegrins and Austria-Hungary. After 1918, the city became a part of Yugoslavia and officially became known as Kotor.

World War II
Between 1941 and 1943 the Kingdom of Italy annexed the area of Kotor which became one of three provinces of the Italian Governorate of Dalmatia – the Province of Cattaro had an area  (subdivided in 15 "Comuni") of 547 km2 and a population of 39,800 inhabitants. Most of the city's inhabitants were Orthodox (with some Roman Catholics). After the war the remaining members of Dalmatian Italians of Kotor (300 inhabitants) left Yugoslavia towards Italy (Istrian-Dalmatian exodus).

Main sights

Kotor has one of the best preserved medieval old towns in the Adriatic and is a double Unesco World Heritage Site: it is part of Natural and Culturo-Historical Region of Kotor and Venetian Works of Defence between the 16th and 17th centuries: Stato da Terra – western Stato da Mar.

It is home to numerous sights, such as the Cathedral of Saint Tryphon in the old town (built in 1166), and the ancient walls which stretch for  directly above the city. Sveti Đorđe and Gospa od Škrpijela islets off the coast of Perast are also among the tourism destinations in the vicinity of Kotor.

Culture

Kotor hosts several summer events, such as the Summer Carnival or Bokeljska Noć. Together with Budva, and the small town of Tuzi, near Podgorica, the city hosted the Federation of European Carnival Cities (FECC) World Carnival City Congress in May 2009.

Kotor Festival of Theatre for Children is one of the most important festivals of its kind in Southeast Europe. Thirty years of this manifestation have marked performances by artists from over 30 countries, from 5 different continents. It was founded in 1993, not far from the place where the first play for children in the Balkans was performed in 1829. The 2017/18 festival was awarded the EFFE Label by the EFA (European Festivals Association). Kotor Festival is highly regarded in the local community and has a large volunteer base.

Kotor has a large population of cats that have become a symbol of the city. The city has several cat stores and a cat museum, as well as the Cats' Square (Trg od mačaka). Water and food is left throughout the city for the cats to feed on, and cardboard boxes are often arranged to be a place for the cats to sleep in. Tourists may notice cats in poor health, which may be due to malnutrition, lack of shelter, fighting, or illness (often a common viral respiratory condition for which medicine is unavailable). The charity Kotor Kitties  exists to try and help the cats of Kotor through spaying and neutering.  
Kotor is described evocatively at the beginning of Marguerite Yourcenar's story 'Marko's Smile.'

Demographics
Kotor is the administrative centre of Kotor municipality, which includes the towns of Risan and Perast, as well as many small hamlets around the Bay of Kotor, and has a population of 22,601.

The town of Kotor itself has 961 inhabitants, but the administrative limits of the town encompass only the area of the Old Town. The urban area of Kotor also includes Dobrota (8,819) and Škaljari (3,807), bringing the population of Kotor's urban area close to 13,000 inhabitants. The total number rises to around 15,000 if the neighbouring hamlets of Muo, Prčanj and Stoliv are included. The entire population of Kotor Municipality was 22,947, as of the 2003 census.

Ethnic composition of the municipality in 2011:

Until the 19th century the main language of Kotor was Italian. During the 19th century, the use of Italian began to decline in favour of Serbian. In 1890, the 18.7% of the population was Italian. The majority of the Italian minority left the city for Italy after the Treaty of Rapallo (1920). The remaining Italians were assimilated or left Kotor after 1945. Today, only 31 people in Kotor identify as ethnic Italians.
According to documents from 1900, Kotor had 7,617 Catholics, and 7,207 Orthodox Christians. Kotor is still the seat of the Catholic Bishopric of Kotor, which covers the entire gulf. In 2011, 78% citizens of Kotor were Orthodox Christians, while 12% were listed as Roman Catholic.

Sports
The local football team is FK Bokelj, who have spent several seasons in the country's top and second tiers. They play their home games at the Stadion pod Vrmcem.

Kotor is a national powerhouse of water polo, which is a popular sport in Montenegro. The team of Primorac Kotor won the LEN Champions League in 2009. Another club from Kotor, VA Cattaro, won the 2010 edition of the LEN Euro Cup.

Transport 
Kotor is connected to the Adriatic Highway and the rest of the coast and inland Montenegro by Vrmac Tunnel. Inland is reachable by detouring from Adriatic highway at Budva or Sutomore (through Sozina tunnel). There is also a historic road connecting Kotor with Cetinje, which has views of Kotor bay.

Dozens of charter planes land daily on Tivat airport during the summer season.

Twin towns - sister cities

Kotor is twinned with:

 Děčín, Czech Republic
 Campomarino, Italy
 Nesebar, Bulgaria
 Přerov, Czech Republic
 Santa Barbara, United States
 Stari Grad (Belgrade), Serbia
 Subotica, Serbia
 Szeged, Hungary
 Trogir, Croatia

See also
 Stato da Màr

References

External links

 
 Visit-Montenegro: Kotor-History
 UNESCO: Natural and Culturo-Historical Region of Kotor

 
Populated places in Kotor Municipality
Illyrian Montenegro
Cities in ancient Illyria
Kingdom of Dalmatia